The Best Democracy Money Can Buy: An Investigative Reporter Exposes the Truth about Globalization, Corporate Cons, and High Finance Fraudsters is a 2002 book by investigative journalist Greg Palast. It is about corporate corruption, global capitalism, environmental destruction, third world exploitation, freedom of speech and political corruption, and the United States presidential election of 2000. Palast used the book as the basis for his 2004 documentary film Bush Family Fortunes.

Content
The first chapter goes into great depth covering the Florida Central Voter File, commonly referred to as the Florida scrub list, starting with a Thomas Cooper who was prevented from voting in 2000 because of a supposed January 30, 2007 conviction date.

References

External links
Author's website

Excerpts from the author
Chapter 1 - Jim Crow in Cyberspace: The unreported Story of how they fixed the vote in Florida
Chapter 2 - The Best Democracy money can buy: The Bushes and the billionaires who love them

2002 non-fiction books
Books about the 2000 United States presidential election
2000 United States presidential election in Florida
Greg Palast
Voter suppression